Church Tongue is an American metalcore band that originated in 2015 in Indianapolis, Indiana. The band's name comes from the movie "The Wedding Singer" with Adam Sandler and Drew Barrymore.

Background
Church Tongue, originally Conquerors, started in 2015. The band is infamous for the band guitarist, Chris Sawicki, setting himself on fire for a show. According to guitarist Nicko Calderon, Sawicki wasn't a member of the band at the time of the incident. The band has played with Beartooth, Vanna, and Household. In 2016, the band signed to Blood and Ink Records. On October 21, 2016, the band released their debut album, Heart Failure via Blood & Ink.

Alongside the album, the band released a music video for "Acid Jesus" on March 10, 2017.

Members
Current
Mike Sugars – Vocals
Nicko Calderon – Guitar
Chris Sawicki – Guitar
Jack Sipes - Bass
Kyle Spinell - Drums

Past
Brandon Bishop - Drums
Justin Quigley - Drums
Ty Berhardt - Drums
Hayden Darnall - Bass
Tony Blondin - Bass

Discography
Studio albums
 Heart Failure (October 21, 2016; Blood & Ink Records)
 Hell Is Empty (December 21, 2018; Delayed Gratification Records)

Singles
 "Worry Doll" (2016)
 "Medicine Breath" (2016)

References

External links
 Mike Sugars' interview with Tuned Up Podcast

Musical groups established in 2012
Christian metal musical groups
Christian hardcore musical groups
Blood and Ink Records artists
2012 establishments in Indiana